Tomáš Krbeček (born 27 October 1985) is a former Czech footballer. He played as striker and central midfielder.

External links
 
 

1985 births
Living people
Czech footballers
Czech Republic youth international footballers
Czech Republic under-21 international footballers
Czech First League players
FC Viktoria Plzeň players
FC Slovan Liberec players
FK Ústí nad Labem players
MFK Ružomberok players
1. FK Příbram players
FC Slavoj Vyšehrad players
Slovak Super Liga players
SpVgg Bayern Hof players
Expatriate footballers in Slovakia
Czech expatriate sportspeople in Slovakia
Association football forwards
Czech twins
Twin sportspeople
Regionalliga players